1,3-Dioxane or m-dioxane is a chemical compound with the molecular formula C4H8O2. It is a saturated six-membered heterocycle with two oxygen atoms in place of carbon atoms at the 1- and 3- positions. The corresponding five-membered rings are known as 1,3-dioxolanes.

Like 1,3-dioxolanes, 1,3-dioxanes are acetals which can be used as protecting groups for carbonyl compounds. They are prepared from the reaction between carbonyl compounds (formaldehyde for the parent 1,3-dioxane) and 1,3-propanediol in the presence of Brönsted or Lewis acid catalysts.

See also
 1,2-Dioxane
 1,4-Dioxane
Dithiane

References

Dioxanes
Cyclic ethers